Cymbalophora rivularis is a moth of the family Erebidae first described by Édouard Ménétries in 1832. It is found in central Italy, the Balkan Peninsula, western Iran, Dagestan, Armenia and western Azerbaijan.

These species can be easily distinguished as C. rivularis because they are smaller and have a yellowish abdomen, and exhibits three black spots on the inferior margin of their forewings. Furthermore, the female is brachypterous, whilst the female of the congeneric species, Cymbalophora pudica, is fully winged.

The wingspan of the male is 20–30 mm.

The larvae feed on Taraxacum and Plantago species.

Similar species 
 Chelis maculosa 
 Cymbalophora pudica

Primary host-plants

References

Callimorphina
Moths of Europe
Moths of Asia
Moths described in 1832
Taxa named by Édouard Ménétries